Suvendu Adhikari (born 15 December 1970) is an Indian politician from the Bharatiya Janata Party who is the current Leader of the Opposition in the West Bengal Legislative Assembly from 10 May 2021. He is a member of the West Bengal Legislative Assembly from Nandigram since May 2021 having defeated his opponent incumbent Chief Minister Mamata Banerjee by 1956 votes. He previously served as the Minister of Transport, Irrigation and Water resource in West Bengal. He was a member of the 15th Lok Sabha and the 16th Lok Sabha (2014-2016), as an All India Trinamool Congress candidate, from Tamluk.

He is the son of Sisir Adhikari, Member of Parliament and former Union Minister of State for Rural Development in the Manmohan Singh government.

Credited as the man who galvanised the people of Nandigram under the umbrella of the Bhumi Uchhed Pratirodh Committee, when rumours of land acquisition for a chemical hub had triggered a movement, Adhikari was a member of the Legislative Assembly from Contai. He defeated CPI(M)’s strongman Lakshman Seth by a margin of 172,958 votes. He resigned from the primary membership of All India Trinamool Congress and joined Bharatiya Janata Party in presence of Home Minister Amit Shah on 19 December 2020. He won the Nandigram assembly seat against TMC's supremo and   Chief Minister of West Bengal Mamata Banerjee in 2021 by a margin of 1956 votes, though there is a dispute regarding this due to loadshedding in counter room while counting at last minute. The issue is still under trial in court.

Early life and education
Adhikari was born on 15 December 1970 to Sisir Adhikari and Gayatri Adhikari at Karkuli in Purba Medinipur district in West Bengal. Sisir Adhikari is a politician, and former Minister of State in Second Manmohan Singh ministry and was elected to the Lok Sabha from Kanthi constituency in 2019. Adhikari is unmarried.

One of Suvendu's brothers, Soumendu, is the chairman of the Kanthi municipal corporation. Dibyendu Adhikari, elected to Lok Sabha in 2019 from Tamluk constituency, is also his brother.

Adhikari received a Master of Arts degree from Netaji Subhas Open University.

Early Political career
Adhikari was first elected as a councillor from Indian National Congress in the Contai Municipality in 1995. In 2006, Adhikari was elected to the West Bengal Legislative Assembly from Kanthi Dakshin constituency. He also became the chairman of Kanthi Municipal Corporation in the same year.

In 2007, Adhikari spearheaded the anti-land-acquisition movement in the Nandigram. He led the Bhumi Uchhed Pratirodh Committee. The ruling Left Front government in West Bengal planned to acquire 10,000 acres of land in the village to set up a special economic zone. This movement catapulted Mamata Banerjee to the centre-stage of Bengali politics. The state CID alleged that Adhikari had supplied arms to the Maoists to wage an armed movement against the state government.

After Adhikari's success in Nandigram, Banerjee made him the party's observer (in-charge) of the Jangal Mahal i.e. Paschim Medinipur, Purulia and Bankura districts. He was successful in expanding the party's base in these districts. In 2009, he was elected to the Lok Sabha from the Tamluk constituency. He defeated his nearest rival Lakshman Seth of Communist Party of India (Marxist) by a margin of approximately 173,000 votes.

In the 2016 West Bengal Legislative Assembly election, Adhikari was pitted against Abdul Kadir Sheikh of the Left Front - Indian National Congress alliance in Nandigram constituency. After getting elected, he resigned as an MP from Tamluk constituency. He was sworn in as the Minister of Transport in the Second Mamata Banerjee ministry on 27 May 2016. Adhikari resigned from the post of chairman of Hooghly River Bridge Commission (HRBC), a statutory body under the Government of West Bengal on 26 November 2020. He also resigned as West Bengal Transport Minister on 27 November 2020. He had tendered his resignation to the speaker of West Bengal Legislative Assembly as MLA on 16 December 2020 which was not accepted by the speaker initially on grounds of technicality. However, it was eventually accepted on 21 December 2020. On 17 December 2020 he resigned from  the primary membership of All India Trinamool Congress.

On 19 December 2020, he joined Bharatiya Janata Party in presence of Home Minister Amit Shah.

2021 West Bengal Legislative Assembly election
He defeated the sitting chief minister of West Bengal Mamata Banerjee in Nandigram assembly seat in 2021 West Bengal Legislative Assembly election by 1956 votes. Mamata Banerjee has filed an election petition in Calcutta High Court challenging the verdict of Nandigram.

On 10 May, Union Minister Ravi Shankar Prasad announced Suvendu Adhikari's name as leader of the BJP legislature party in the West Bengal assembly.

Electoral history
 1995 : Elected as a councillor from Indian National Congress in the Contai Municipality 
 2006 : Elected to West Bengal Vidhan Sabha, from Kanthi Dakshin (Vidhan Sabha constituency) as member of AITC .
 Resigned mid-term to join Lok Sabha
 2009 : Elected to Lok Sabha, from Tamluk (Lok Sabha constituency), member of AITC (All India Trinamool Congress)
 2014 : Elected to Lok Sabha, from Tamluk (Lok Sabha constituency)  
 Resigned mid-term to join Vidhan Sabha
 2016 : Elected to West Bengal Vidhan Sabha, from Nandigram (Vidhan Sabha constituency), member of AITC
 2021 : Elected to West Bengal Vidhan Sabha, from Nandigram (Vidhan Sabha constituency), member of BJP

Controversies

Saradha scam
Adhikari was interrogated by the Central Bureau of Investigation in September 2014 for his alleged role in the Saradha Group financial scandal. A former employee of the company alleged the company's head Sudipto Sen met Adhikari before fleeing to Kashmir. Adhikari rejected such allegations.

See also
2021 Nandigram controversy
Mukul Roy 
Arjun Singh
Saumitra Khan
Rajib Banerjee

References

1970 births
Living people
India MPs 2009–2014
People from Purba Medinipur district
Lok Sabha members from West Bengal
Former members of Trinamool Congress
Bharatiya Janata Party politicians from West Bengal
West Bengal MLAs 2021–2026
India MPs 2014–2019